In mathematics, the Calogero–Degasperis–Fokas equation is the nonlinear partial differential equation

This equation was named after F. Calogero, A. Degasperis, and A. Fokas.

See also 
Boomeron equation
Zoomeron equation

External links
 

Partial differential equations
Integrable systems